Charles Perry (3 January 1866 – 2 July 1927) was an English football centre-half who played for West Bromwich Albion and England.

Biography 
Perry was born in West Bromwich. He joined West Bromwich Albion in March 1884 and turned professional in August 1885. He made his first team debut in the 1886 FA Cup Final against Blackburn Rovers at The Oval, a match that finished 0–0. Perry collected a runners-up medal after Albion lost 2–0 in the replay. He was on the losing side once more in the 1887 final, in a 2–0 defeat to Aston Villa. He picked up his first winner's medal in 1888 as Albion beat Preston North End 2–1.

Charlie Perry made his league debut on 8 September 1888, at centre-half for West Bromwich Albion in a 2–0 win against Stoke at the Victoria Ground, Stoke. He played 20 of the "Throstles" 22 Football League matches and was part of a defence-line that achieved four clean-sheets whilst restricting the opposition to a single goal on four occasions.

Charlie Perry had another winner's medal in the 3–0 win over Aston Villa in 1892. However, he missed the 1895 FA Cup Final due to an injury that later forced his retirement in May 1896. Perry made 219 career appearances for Albion in all competitions, scoring 16 goals. From 1896 until 1902 he served the club as a director.

Charlie Perry was a superb player and grand captain. He had a polished style, was determined in everything he did, cool under pressure and a man who marshalled his defence magnificently from the centre-half position, which was undoubtedly his best.

His younger brother, Tom also played for West Bromwich Albion from 1890 to 1901 and made one England appearance.

Honours
West Bromwich Albion
FA Cup winner: 1888 & 1892
FA Cup runner-up: 1886 & 1887

References

External links

1866 births
1927 deaths
Sportspeople from West Bromwich
English footballers
England international footballers
West Bromwich Albion F.C. players
Association football central defenders
English Football League representative players
FA Cup Final players